Katarina Srebotnik and Daniel Nestor were the defending champions, but they chose not to participate together. Srebotnik was scheduled to play with Nenad Zimonjić, but the pair were forced to withdraw from their first round match after Srebotnik was injured during her 2nd round doubles match. Nestor was scheduled to play with Maria Kirilenko, but the pair withdrew after Kirilenko sustained an injury during her 3rd round singles match.

Bethanie Mattek-Sands and Horia Tecău won the mixed doubles title at the 2012 Australian Open tennis tournament, defeating Elena Vesnina and Leander Paes in the final 6–3, 5–7, [10–3].

Seeds

Draw

Finals

Top half

Bottom half

References

 2012 Australian Open – Doubles draws and results at the International Tennis Federation

Mixed Doubles
Australian Open (tennis) by year – Mixed doubles